The Montlake Historic District is a part of Montlake, located northeast of the downtown district in Seattle, Washington that has been listed on the National Register of Historic Places since October 15, 2015. It primarily contains residential property; however there are some other types of buildings within the district such as the Northwest Fisheries Science Center of the National Marine Fisheries Service and the Seattle Yacht Club.

It is notable for the architectural styles displayed by homes in the district and the boulevards planned by the Olmsted Brothers in 1903. Architectural styles include Craftsman, Colonial Revival, and Tudor Revival, and vernacular. Most were built between 1905 and 1959, with construction reaching a peak in the 1920s. Construction of the district was spurred by the Olmsted plan as well as the 1909 Alaska–Yukon–Pacific Exposition. Montlake Boulevard, a portion of Lake Washington Boulevard, East Montlake Park, West Montlake Park, Montlake Playfield, Boyer Pocket Park, and the Lake Washington Canal Reserve Land are all parks within the district. The State Route 520 corridor which divides the district into two sections (the northern section of the historic district only has two blocks out of a total of 50) is excluded from the district.

See also
Seattle Parks and Recreation

References

Historic districts on the National Register of Historic Places in Washington (state)
Colonial Revival architecture in Washington (state)
Tudor Revival architecture in Washington (state)
Neighborhoods in Seattle
Montlake, Seattle
National Register of Historic Places in Seattle